Nadine Morano (born 6 November 1963 in Nancy) is a French politician of the Republicans who has been serving as Member of the European Parliament since 2014. She previously was a member of the National Assembly and a minister.

Early life
Morano was born on 6 November 1963 in Nancy, France. Her father was a truck driver. Her mother, Monique Generelli, was a switchboard operator, daughter of a Piedmontese mason from Verbano-Cusio-Ossola.

Political career
Morano served as a member of the National Assembly from 2002 to 2008, representing Meurthe-et-Moselle. In parliament, she was a member of the Committee on Cultural Affairs (2002-2007) and the Defense Committee (2007-2008).

Morano served as the Deputy Minister for Apprenticeship and Vocational Training under the Minister of Labour, Employment and Health, Xavier Bertrand. She was previously Secretary of State for Family in the government of François Fillon on 18 March 2008.

Morano was elected Member of the European Parliament in the 2014 European elections, representing East France. She has since been serving on the Committee on Industry, Research and Energy. In addition to her committee assignments, she is a member of the Parliament's delegation for relations with the Pan-African Parliament (PAP).

Ahead of the 2015 French regional elections, the Republicans' chair Nicolas Sarkozy removed Morano – then considered one of his staunchest allies – from the party's list after she state that France was a "white race" country that must stay that way.

Later that year, Morano announced her intention to compete for a presidential nomination in the Republicans' primaries for the 2017 presidential elections. She later supported François Fillon as her party's candidate before urging him to withdraw his bid amid the so-called Fillon affair. In the Republicans' 2017 leadership election, she endorsed Laurent Wauquiez.

Ahead of the 2022 presidential elections, Morano publicly declared her support for Michel Barnier as the Republicans' candidate.

Controversy
Morano is a frequent user of social media whose outspoken style and running commentary are a frequent source of mockery. French daily Le Monde has created a web page, dubbed the "Moranator," that generates real phrases the politician has used and allows visitors to post them to their Twitter pages.

In September 2015, Morano quoted General Charles de Gaulle on On n'est pas couché, saying that "France is a Judeo-Christian country, of white race". This resulted in her removal as head of the Les Républicains (the former UMP) list for the regional elections in Meurthe-et-Moselle.

In 2019, Morano faced allegations of racism when she criticized the way government spokesperson Sibeth Ndiaye dressed as "circus clothes", adding that Ndiaye became a French citizen "only" three years before, "clearly with big gaps over French culture, unworthy of her government post". Gilles Le Gendre, who chaired the La République En Marche group in the National Assembly at the time, called on Morano to withdraw her comments and apologize or be prosecuted.

In 2020, Morano stated that French actress Aïssa Maïga, who was born in Senegal, should "go back to Africa" if she "was not happy with seeing so many white people in France".

Personal life
Morano has been divorced; she has two sons and a daughter.

External links
 Official web site

References

1963 births
Living people
Politicians from Nancy, France
French people of Italian descent
People of Piedmontese descent
French Roman Catholics
The Republicans (France) politicians
Union for a Popular Movement politicians
Government ministers of France
Secretaries of State of France
MEPs for East France 2014–2019
MEPs for France 2019–2024
21st-century women MEPs for France
The Republicans (France) MEPs
20th-century French women politicians
Women government ministers of France
Deputies of the 12th National Assembly of the French Fifth Republic
Deputies of the 13th National Assembly of the French Fifth Republic